Do Ab-e Kojur (also Romanized as Do Āb-e Kojūr; also known as Do Āb) is a village in Panjak-e Rastaq Rural District, Kojur District, Nowshahr County, Mazandaran Province, Iran. At the 2006 census, its population was 67, in 19 families.

References 

Populated places in Nowshahr County